Jeffrey Tunnell is a video game producer, programmer and designer.

In 1984 he founded Dynamix with Damon Slye in Eugene, Oregon.

In 1990, Tunnell left Dynamix to start Jeff Tunnell Productions. Tunnell would go on to create famous brands such as The Incredible Machine, Trophy Bass, and the 3-D Ultra Pinball series while at Jeff Tunnell Productions. These products were some of the most successful retail products to be published by Dynamix.

In 1993, Sid & Al's Incredible Toons earned Tunnell and Chris Cole a patent for the game's concepts.

In 1995, Tunnell returned to Dynamix in a leadership role.

In 2001, after Dynamix was disbanded, Tunnell co-founded GarageGames, an independent video game publisher, which is also the developer of the Torque Game Engine.

In 2007, GarageGames was acquired by InterActiveCorp, the media conglomerate founded by Barry Diller. Tunnell remained on as Chief Creative Officer of GarageGames. Tunnell was a contributor behind the vision of the original InstantAction distribution platform.

In 2008, Tunnell left GarageGames to pursue other interests.

In 2009, Tunnell founded PushButton Labs along with former partners and employees from GarageGames and Dynamix. PushButton Labs led development on one of the most successful games of 2010, Playdom's Social City, which reached more than 10M monthly active users.  PushButton Labs IP was acquired by Disney in 2011 and they subsequently wound down operations.

In 2012, Tunnell founded Spotkin along with former partners of PushButton Labs, GarageGames, and Dynamix.

On March 22, 2017, Tunnell announced his retirement from game development, citing market saturation as a deciding factor.

On June 13, 2020, Tunnell declared his return to gaming development by announcing the creation of Monster Ideas, a company that plans to produce “community economy”  games that use crypto technology on the backend.

Games
 Arcticfox (1986), Dynamix
 Skyfox II: The Cygnus Conflict (1987), Electronic Arts
 Project Firestart (1989), Electronic Arts
 Motocross (1989), Gamestar
 Ghostbusters II (1989), Activision
 Deathtrack (1989), Activision
 David Wolf: Secret Agent (1989), Dynamix
 Caveman Ugh-Lympics (1989), Electronic Arts
 A-10 Tank Killer (1989), Dynamix
 Stellar 7 (1990), Dynamix
 Rise of the Dragon (1990), Sierra On-Line
 Red Baron (1990), Sierra On-Line
 Heart of China (1991), Sierra On-Line
 The Adventures of Willy Beamish (1991), Sierra On-Line
 Quarky & Quaysoo's Turbo Science (1992), Sierra On-Line
 Mega Math (1992), Sierra On-Line
 Sid & Al's Incredible Toons (1993), Sierra On-Line
 The Incredible Machine (1993), Sierra On-Line
 Betrayal at Krondor (1993), Sierra On-Line
 Alien Legacy (1993), Sierra On-Line
 Lode Runner: The Legend Returns (1994), Sierra On-Line
 The Incredible Toon Machine (1994), Sierra On-Line
 The Incredible Machine 2 (1994), Sierra On-Line
 Bouncers (1994), SEGA Entertainment
 Lode Runner Online: The Mad Monks' Revenge (1995), Sierra On-Line
 Hunter Hunted (1996), Sierra On-Line
 3-D Ultra Pinball: Creep Night (1996), Sierra On-Line
 Rama (1997), Sierra On-Line
 Starsiege: Tribes (1998), Sierra On-Line
 Starsiege (1998), Sierra On-Line
 3-D Ultra Minigolf (1998), Sierra On-Line
 Return of the Incredible Machine: Contraptions (2000), Sierra On-Line
 3-D Ultra Lionel Train Town Deluxe (2000), Sierra On-Line
 Tribes 2 (2001), Sierra On-Line
 Marble Blast Gold (2003), GarageGames
 Chain Reaction (2003), Monster Studios
 Marble Blast Ultra (2006), GarageGames
 Rack 'Em Up Roadtrip (2006), Oberon Media
 Puzzle Poker (2006), GarageGames
 Grunts: Skirmish (2009), PushButton Labs
 Social City (2010), PushButton Labs, Playdom
 The Incredible Machine: Mobile (2010), PushButton Labs, Playdom
 Quick Shooter (2012), Spotkin
 Double Doodle (2013), Spotkin
 Contraption Maker (2014), Spotkin

References

External links
Jeff Tunnell's website
Spotkin
Jeff Tunnell at MobyGames
Jeff Tunnell game library at MakeItBigInGames
MakeItBigInGames Jeff Tunnell's development blog

Year of birth missing (living people)
Living people
Video game programmers
Video game designers